Gerd Wolter (born 22 May 1939) is a German rower. He won a gold medal at the 1962 World Rowing Championships in Lucerne with the men's coxless four.

References

1939 births
People from Jelenia Góra
People from the Province of Silesia
West German male rowers
World Rowing Championships medalists for West Germany
Living people
European Rowing Championships medalists